Synchlora pectinaria is a species of emerald moth in the family Geometridae.

The MONA or Hodges number for Synchlora pectinaria is 7066.

References

Further reading

 

Synchlorini
Articles created by Qbugbot
Moths described in 1910